Lavelle Lamar Hawkins (born July 12, 1986) is a former American football wide receiver. He was drafted by the Tennessee Titans in the fourth round (126th overall) of the 2008 NFL Draft. He played college football at California. He is currently the wide receivers coach/director of football operations at his alma mater, Edison High School in Stockton, California. He also adopted his nephews jaysean and Moses

Early years
He played high school football at Edison High School in Stockton, California. He originally committed to LSU. As a freshman in 2004, he transferred after one game to City College in San Francisco. As a sophomore, he transferred to California.

Professional career

Tennessee Titans
The Tennessee Titans selected Hawkins with the 126th overall pick in the fourth round of the 2008 NFL Draft. He is notable for being the player the Titans selected with the pick they acquired in the Pacman Jones trade, as well as being the only wide receiver the Titans selected in the 2008 NFL Draft.

During five seasons with the Titans, Hawkins caught 71 receptions for 771 yards.  His most productive season was in 2011 when he played in all 16 games and caught 47 passes for 470 yards and one touchdown.

New England Patriots
Hawkins was signed by the New England Patriots to a 2-year deal on May 9, 2013.
On July 31, 2013, Hawkins was released.

San Francisco 49ers
On August 2, 2013, Hawkins signed with the San Francisco 49ers.  Despite a productive preseason, he was released during the final round of roster cuts on August 31, 2013.

San Diego Chargers
On October 1, 2013, Hawkins signed with the San Diego Chargers.  Hawkins appeared in four games as a kick returner.

Tampa Bay Buccaneers
On April 7, 2014, Hawkins signed with the Tampa Bay Buccaneers. Hawkins was released by the Buccaneers on August 20, 2014.

BC Lions
On March 24, 2015, Hawkins signed with the BC Lions, reuniting with his former university coach  Jeff Tedford. He left the team during training camp on June 6, 2016, to become a firefighter.

Personal
Hawkins is a cousin of former New Orleans Saints running back Lynell Hamilton.

References

External links

Lavelle Hawkins' Official Yardbarker Blog
California Golden Bears bio
Tennessee Titans bio
San Diego Chargers bio
Tampa Bay Buccaneers bio

1986 births
Living people
Players of American football from Stockton, California
American football wide receivers
California Golden Bears football players
Tennessee Titans players
New England Patriots players
San Francisco 49ers players
San Diego Chargers players
Tampa Bay Buccaneers players
BC Lions players